Enteridium is a genus of slime molds belonging to the family Reticulariaceae.

Mycobank, WoRMS and ITIS list this name as accepted. However, IRMNG lists it as rejected and gives Reticularia Bulliard, 1788 as the accepted name, as does Index Fungorum.

Species
Species via Mycobank:

Enteridium antarcticum
Enteridium atrum
Enteridium aureum
Enteridium cinereum
Enteridium intermedium
Enteridium japonicum
Enteridium juranum
Enteridium liceoides
Enteridium lobatum
Enteridium lycoperdon
Enteridium macrosporum
Enteridium minutum
Enteridium olivaceum
Enteridium rostrupii
Enteridium rozeanum
Enteridium rubiginosum
Enteridium simulans
Enteridium splendens
Species via IRMNG

 Enteridium cinereum Schwein., 1832 accepted as Fuligo cinerea (Schwein.) Morgan, 1896
 Enteridium intermedium (Nann.-Bremek.) M.L. Farr, 1976 accepted as Reticularia intermedia Nann.-Bremek., 1958
 Enteridium juranum (Meyl.) Mornand, 1993 accepted as Reticularia jurana Meyl., 1908
 Enteridium liceoides (Lister) G. Lister, 1919 accepted as Reticularia liceoides (Lister) Nann.-Bremek., 1973
 Enteridium lobatum (Lister) M.L. Farr, 1976 accepted as Reticularia lobata Lister, 1894
 Enteridium lycoperdon (Bull.) M.L. Farr, 1976 accepted as Reticularia lycoperdon Bull., 1790
 Enteridium minutum Sturgis, 1917 accepted as Reticularia olivacea Fr., 1829
 Enteridium olivaceum Ehrenb., 1818 accepted as Reticularia olivacea Fr., 1829
 Enteridium simulans Rostaf., 1876 accepted as Reticularia olivacea Fr., 1829
 Enteridium splendens (Morgan) T. Macbr., 1899 accepted as Reticularia splendens Morgan, 1893

References

Myxogastria
Amoebozoa genera
Taxa named by Christian Gottfried Ehrenberg